The fixture between Helsingborgs IF and Malmö FF is a local derby in Scania, Sweden and a fierce rivalry. The derby does not have a common name, any derby in Scania is usually called a "Skånederby", the fixture is sometimes referred to as Slaget om Skåne. The rivalry has arisen because the two clubs are the most historically successful clubs in Scania and also come from the two most populous cities in Scania. The two clubs have also played most seasons in the top tier league Allsvenskan of all Scanian clubs and they are also the only Scanian clubs to have won the Swedish football championship, Malmö FF with 22 titles and Helsingborgs IF with 5 titles. In the early days of Swedish club football before the time of national league play the two clubs often faced each other in the final of the regional championship "Distriktmästerskapet".  The clubs have also faced each other in Svenska Cupen and Supercupen. The majority of all matches between the two clubs have taken place in Allsvenskan. The rivalry temporarily died out between 1968 and 1993 when they weren't playing in the same league, Helsingborgs IF had been relegated from Allsvenskan and spent 23 season in lower leagues while Malmö FF played in Allsvenskan. In 2020, Helsingborgs IF were relegated from the top tier once again; Malmö FF had a one year stint in Superettan in 2000.

Shared player history

Transfers
The lists are incomplete.
There have been several direct transfers between the rivals, the most recent transfer was on 1 January 2012. The majority of the transfers has been from Malmö FF to Helsingborgs IF in the early 1990s when Helsingborg made their comeback to Allsvenskan after having been in lower leagues since the late 1960s.

There have also been a few players who have played for both clubs although transferred via another club.

Played for one, managed the other

Managed both clubs
Åge Hareide is the only man to have managed both clubs. With Helsingborgs IF he won the 1999 Allsvenskan and the 1997–98 Svenska Cupen. With Malmö FF he won the 2014 Allsvenskan and the 2014 Svenska Supercupen.

1 Only competitive matches are counted.

Statistics

Table correct as of 18 September 2022

Last five head-to-head fixtures

Honours

Table correct as of 27 June 2022

All-time results

Helsingborgs IF in the league at home

Malmö FF in the league at home

1 Awarded 0–3 after the original match had been suspended with the score at a 0–1 as a result of a spectator scandal.

Results at home in Cup matches
Includes fixtures for the regional competition "Distriktsmästerskapet".

References

Bibliography

External links
 Sveriges Fotbollshistoriker och Statistiker – Statistics for all Allsvenskan and Svenska Cupen matches
 Helsingborgs IF official website
 Malmö FF official website

Helsingborgs IF
Malmö FF
Football derbies in Sweden